Bundaran HI is a TransJakarta bus rapid transit station on the M.H. Thamrin Street, Jakarta, Indonesia that serves Corridor 1. The station's name came from the Hotel Indonesia Roundabout which is located not far from the BRT station.

History 

The Bundaran HI BRT Station was demolished for the construction of the Jakarta MRT on January 6, 2014. However, since March 24 2019, the BRT Station was reopened and integrated with the Bundaran HI MRT Station which is located underneath this bus stop.

On April 15, 2022, the Bundaran HI BRT Station was closed again for the rebuilding of the BRT Station along with 10 other BRT Stations to be revitalized including the Dukuh Atas 1, Tosari, Juanda, Cikoko Stasiun Cawang, Sarinah, Kebon Pala, Kwitang, Balai Kota, Gelora Bung Karno (GBK), and Stasiun Jatinegara 2 BRT Stations. As an alternative, a shuttle bus route has been prepared to support waiters during the BRT Station revitalization process. The route consists of the National Monument (Monas)-Semanggi (1ST) route which operates in corridor 1 (until 11 September 2022), and the Pecenongan-Pintu Air Juanda (2PJ) route in corridor 2.

Despite the construction has not yet been fully completed, the Bundaran HI BRT Station has started carrying out customer trials on October 6, 2022. It only serves corridor routes from 05.00–21.00. During the trial period, the 2nd floor area of ​​this BRT Station and several BRT Station facilities (including direct access from the MRT Station) could not be utilized by customers. After the Community Activities Restrictions Enforcement (PPKM) was lifted by the Government on December 30, 2022, Bundaran HI bus station began to fully operational 24 hours and the 2nd floor of the bus stop including toilets, prayer rooms, and skydeck. Both sides of the bus station could be accessed freely by Transjakarta customers who access the Bundaran HI bus station.

On March 4, 2023, Bundaran HI bus station began to service as the terminus of corridor 3 temporarily, due to the Jakarta MRT phase 2 project.

Builiding and layout 

The new Bundaran HI BRT Station building have two floors, using the same design as the Tosari BRT Station, which resembles a cruise ship. The building has passenger, commercial and waiting areas and a viewing deck overlooking the Selamat Datang Monument. Ahead of the trial run, several parties criticized the design of the BRT Station as it obstructed the view of the Selamat Datang Monument.

Incidents 
The Bundaran HI BRT station was burned by demonstrators on 8 October 2020 during the Job Creation Law Demonstration along with 8 other BRT Stations affected. Losses due to this incident are estimated at up to 45 billion rupiah. The incident was very unfortunate considering that this BRT Station is an iconic BRT Station and is one of the destinations for many commuters heading to the office/mall complex.

Places nearby 
 CNN, CNN International, CNN International Asia Pacific
 Selamat Datang Monument
 Wisma Nusantara
 Plaza Indonesia
 Grand Hyatt Jakarta
 The Plaza
 The Keraton
 Indonesia One Tower
 Sinar Mas Land Plaza
 Graha Mandiri
 Deutsche Bank
  Embassy of Belgium
  Embassy of Japan
 Thamrin City
 Pullman Jakarta Indonesia
 Thamrin City Amaris Hotel

Gallery

Notes

References

External links 
 

TransJakarta
Bus stations in Indonesia
Central Jakarta